Ana Plácido (1831—1895) was a Portuguese novelist and author. Her best known work is the 1871 novel Herança de Lágrimas (English: A Legacy of Tears), and she is also noted for an autobiographical book Luz Coada por Ferros (English: Light Filtered Through Bars; published in 1863). She was married to the author Camilo Castelo Branco, with whom she earlier had an extra-marital affair while she was married.

Herança de Lágrimas tells the story of a married woman named Diana who decides not to engage in adultery after reading the story of her mother's fate after doing similarly. The novel was written to try and "voice a female-centred perspective on life" according to the academics Hilary Owen and Cláudio Pazos Alonso.

References

External links
 

1831 births
1895 deaths
Portuguese women novelists
Place of birth missing
19th-century Portuguese writers
19th-century Portuguese novelists
19th-century Portuguese women writers